Carlos César Delía (January 21, 1923 Concordia, Entre Ríos – October 6, 2014) was an Argentine equestrian, a diplomat and a brigade general in the Argentine Army.

Sporting career
He represented his country in several Olympic Games and World Championships, achieving a second place at the 1960 World Championship in Venice, Italy.

Carlos was the flag bearer for Argentina at the opening ceremony of the 1972 Summer Olympics in Munich, West Germany.

He served as president of the Argentine Equestrian Federation from 1983 to 1993 and as president of the Argentine Military Sporting Federation from 1980 to 1983.

Some of his best remembered horses were Huipil, Maravedí and Cardón.

Military career
From January 1974 to January 1975, Delía was the Military Attache to the United States, Embassy of Argentina. On May 6, 1975, the U.S. Department of the Army considered presenting Delía with the Legion of Merit, Degree of Officer. Upon his return to Argentina, his last appointment in the Argentine Army was as commander of the III Army Corps, which at the time was engaged in battle against the People's Revolutionary Army in the province of Tucumán. In August 1975, after an institutional crisis due to the designation of active colonel Vicente Damasco as Minister of the Interior, Delía, as the second highest ranking general, rebelled against the commander of the Army, lt. general Numa Laplane. The crisis ended with the appointment of brigade general Jorge Rafael Videla as commander of the Army, the replacement of Damasco with civilian Angel Federico Robledo and the retirement of both Numa Laplane and Delía.

Diplomatic career
In July 1976, Delía was designated as Ambassador of Argentina to Belgium, post he held until January, 1980.

References

External links
1956 Olympic Games Results
Carlos César Delía's profile at Sports Reference.com
Brigade General Delía assuming command of the III Army Corps, early 1975
Delía as Argentina flagbearer at the 1972 Olympic Games in Munich (at 3:45)

1923 births
2014 deaths
Show jumping riders
Sportspeople from Entre Ríos Province
Argentine male equestrians
Olympic equestrians of Argentina
Equestrians at the 1956 Summer Olympics
Equestrians at the 1960 Summer Olympics
Equestrians at the 1964 Summer Olympics
Equestrians at the 1968 Summer Olympics
Equestrians at the 1972 Summer Olympics
Burials at La Chacarita Cemetery
Pan American Games medalists in equestrian
Pan American Games silver medalists for Argentina
Equestrians at the 1951 Pan American Games
Equestrians at the 1963 Pan American Games
Medalists at the 1951 Pan American Games
Medalists at the 1963 Pan American Games